Hampton Park is a suburb in Melbourne, Victoria, Australia, 36 km south-east of Melbourne's Central Business District, located within the City of Casey local government area. Hampton Park recorded a population of 26,082 at the 2021 census.

Hampton Park is bounded by the South Gippsland Freeway in the west, Centre Road in the north, a line generally parallel to Langbourne Drive in the east, and Glasscocks Road in the south.

The original development of Hampton Park dates from the post World War I era, when the area around Somerville Road was subdivided, with the Post Office opening on 22 November 1920. Electricity was connected in Hampton Park in 1942 and town water in 1961. Until these services were connected the people relied on lamps and tank water for their light and water needs.

Significant development of the area commenced in the 1970s, with development continuing through to the present. Development in the neighbouring Lynbrook estate commenced in 1994. The Hampton Park and Lynbrook areas have significant areas of land remaining for development.

Hampton Park, Lynbrook and Lyndhurst form a growing residential area that has experienced a significant increase in population from 1996 to 2001. This increase in population has occurred due to an increase in the dwelling stock from 1996 to 2001.

Population

In the 2016 Census, there were 25,530 people in Hampton Park. 41.7% of people were born in Australia. The next most common countries of birth were India 7.8%, Afghanistan 5.2%, Sri Lanka 4.7%, New Zealand 3.5% and Philippines 3.1%. 43.1% of people spoke only English at home. Other languages spoken at home included Sinhalese 3.8%, Dari 3.7%, Hazaraghi 3.1%, Khmer 2.5% and Punjabi 2.4%. The most common responses for religion were Catholic 24.3%, No Religion 16.8% and Islam 12.0%.

Churches

Hampton Park Baptist Church

St Kevins Catholic Church

United Pentecostal Church of Lynbrook

Aspire Church (Australian Christian Churches / AOG)

Uniting Place (Uniting Church of Australia)

Sts Peter and Paul Melkite Catholic Church

Transport

The nearest railway station is Lynbrook and Hallam railway station on the Cranbourne railway line and Pakenham line respectively. Buses operate regularly to Hallam station. One of the buses (891) travels from Lynbrook railway station to Hallam railway station to Westfield Fountain Gate

Community

Hampton Park has its own library, community hall, high school called Hampton Park Secondary College, and several primary schools. There is a local supermarket complex called Hampton Park Central (previously Hampton Park Shopping Square), and it is close to the much larger Westfield Fountain Gate in Narre Warren.
 
The town has an Australian Rules football team competing in the Mornington Peninsula Nepean Football League. The football ground is located at Robert Booth Reserve along with Hampton Park Tennis Club.

Education
Hampton Park has a number primary schools and one secondary college located in the community of Hampton Park and catering to its growing primary and secondary educational requirements.

Secondary College
 Hampton Park Secondary College located at 58-96 Fordholm Rd. It was established in 1986, and is located next to River Gum Primary School.

Primary Schools
 Coral Park Primary School. The school was established in 1991 and is located at 145 Coral Dr. 
 River Gum Primary School. The school is located at 63 Fordholm Rd. 
 St Kevin's Primary School. The school is located at 120 Hallam Road. The school was first established in 1988 on Somerville Road. In 1990 the school was relocated to the present site on Hallam Road. A parish church incorporating a chapel and hall was also built on the present site in 1991.
 Kilberry Valley Primary School. Located at Cnr Kilberry Boulevard and Warana Drive. 
 Hampton Park Primary School. The school was built by Mr Robjant and opened on 5 February 1922 with 38 students in a one roomed school house, which is still being used as a classroom today and is located at 32 Somerville Road.

See also
 City of Cranbourne – Hampton Park was previously within this former local government area.

References

External links
Hampton Park Volunteer Fire Brigade's history of Hampton Park
Hampton Park Tennis Club
 http://www.kilberryps.vic.edu.au/
 http://www.skhamptonpark.catholic.edu.au/
 http://www.hpps.vic.edu.au/
 http://www.coralparkps.vic.edu.au/
 http://www.rivergumps.vic.edu.au/
 http://hpsc.vic.edu.au/

Suburbs of Melbourne
Suburbs of the City of Casey